Shalkar is a settlement in Aiyrtau District, North Kazakhstan Region, Kazakhstan. It is the head of the Lobanov rural district (KATO code - 593230100). Population:

Geography
Shalkar town is located close to the southeast of the lake of the same name.

See also
Kokshetau Lakes

References

Populated places in North Kazakhstan Region

ru:Шалкар (Северо-Казахстанская область)